The following is a list of Singaporean electoral divisions from 2006 to 2011 that served as constituencies that elected Members of Parliament (MPs) to the 11th Parliament of Singapore in the 2006 Singaporean general election. Each electoral division is further subdivided into polling districts.

Group Representation Constituencies

Single Member Constituencies

References 

2006
2006 Singaporean general election